Ilex integra, the elegance female holly, also called mochi tree, is an ornamental tree of the holly genus, which is native to parts of Asia, including Korea; Taiwan; the mid-southern regions of China; and Honshu, Shikoku and Kyushu in Japan. Its flower is light yellow. The species was botanically described in 1784.

Uses 
The bark of the Ilex integra is an ingredient in birdlime, and it is also sometimes planted as a sacred tree.

References

External links 
 Ilex integra

integra
Plants described in 1784
Flora of China
Flora of Taiwan
Flora of Japan
Trees of Korea